The pyramidal eminence (pyramid) is a conical projection in the middle ear.  It is situated immediately behind the fenestra vestibuli (oval window), and in front of the vertical portion of the facial canal; it is hollow, and contains the stapedius muscle; its summit projects forward toward the fenestra vestibuli, and is pierced by a small aperture which transmits the tendon of the muscle.

The cavity in the pyramidal eminence is prolonged downward and backward in front of the facial canal, and communicates with it by a minute aperture which transmits a twig from the facial nerve to the stapedius muscle.

References 

Auditory system